Murski Črnci is a village in the Municipality of Tišina in the Prekmurje region of northeastern Slovenia.

There is a small chapel in the centre of the village. It was built in 1896 and 1897 in the Neo-Gothic style.

References

External links
Murski Črnci on Geopedia

Populated places in the Municipality of Tišina